Bernard Grosfilley (3 August 1949 – 16 January 2020) was a French alpine skier.

References

French male alpine skiers
1949 births
2020 deaths